St. Helens High School (SHHS) is a public high school located in St. Helens, Oregon, United States. The city was founded in 1850 and the SHHS public school was built in the 1950s.  During the 2022-2023 academic year, it served approximately 960 students. 

An auxiliary filming for the movie Twilight took place at the school in April 2008.

Academics
In 2015, SHHS had a class size of 224 students. 73% were on-time graduates and 45 dropped out.

In 2014, SHHS had a class size of 259 students. 85% were on-time graduates and 27 dropped out.

Extracurricular activities
SHHS' clubs include drama club and robotics club, which takes part in the FRC tournament.

Sports include football, boys' and girls' soccer, volleyball, cheer, color guard, marching band, swim team, wrestling, boys' and girls' basketball, track & field, golf, baseball, softball, and boys' and girls' tennis.

In 2019 claims that opponents of St. Helens had been subjected to years of racist taunting were reported in the media and discussed in the State Senate.

Accomplishments
 Football 3A state champions – 1992, 1996
 Track & Field Boys 5A state champions – 2007
 Volleyball 5A state champions – 2014

Notable alumni
 Holly Madison (1997) – television personality

References

External links
 St Helens High School

High schools in Columbia County, Oregon
St. Helens, Oregon
Public high schools in Oregon